Psephis is a genus of moths of the family Crambidae.

Species
Psephis gomalis Schaus, 1920
Psephis ministralis 
Psephis myrmidonalis Guenée, 1854

References

Natural History Museum Lepidoptera genus database

Glaphyriinae
Crambidae genera
Taxa named by Achille Guenée